Gorna Bela Crkva (meaning Upper White Church;) is a village in the Resen Municipality of the Republic of North Macedonia, north of Lake Prespa. The village is situated under  from the municipal centre of Resen.

Demographics
Gorna Bela Crkva has a mixed population of Bektashi Muslim Albanians, known locally as Kolonjarë, Turks, and Macedonians.

Gallery

References

Villages in Resen Municipality
Albanian communities in North Macedonia